The 94th Pennsylvania House of Representatives District is located in South Central Pennsylvania and has been represented by Wendy Fink since 2023.

District profile
The 94th District is located in York County and includes the following areas: 

Chanceford Township
Delta
East Prospect
Felton
Lower Chanceford Township
Lower Windsor Township
Peach Bottom Township
Red Lion
Springettsbury Township (part)
 District 01
 District 04
 District 05
 District 06 
 District 08
Windsor
Windsor Township
Yorkana

Representatives

References

Government of York County, Pennsylvania
94